The 2002 Colorado gubernatorial election was held on November 5, 2002 to elect the governor of Colorado. Bill Owens, the Republican incumbent, defeated Democratic nominee Rollie Heath to win a second term. Owen's win set the record for biggest win by a Republican in a Colorado gubernatorial election (Democrats won by larger margins in 1982, 1948, and 1928, with Billy Adams' 35 point blowout in that year being the greatest victory for a candidate of any party). As of 2022, this is the last time a Republican was elected Governor of Colorado.

Republican primary

Candidates
Bill Owens, incumbent Governor of Colorado

Results

Democratic primary

Candidates
Rollie Heath, businessman

Results

General election

Debates
Complete video of debate, September 7, 2002
Complete video of debate, September 24, 2002
Complete video of debate, October 17, 2002

Predictions

Results

References

2002 United States gubernatorial elections
2002
Gubernatorial